The 1953 Western Michigan Broncos football team represented Michigan College of Education (later renamed Western Michigan University) in the Mid-American Conference (MAC) during the 1953 college football season.  In their first season under head coach Jack Petoskey, the Broncos compiled a 1–6–1 record (0–4–1 against MAC opponents), finished in sixth place in the MAC, and were outscored by their opponents, 238 to 66.  The team played its home games at Waldo Stadium in Kalamazoo, Michigan.

Guard Floyd Stollsteimer was the team captain. Offensive tackle Leslie Koster received the team's most outstanding player award.

In December 1952, assistant coach Jack Petoskey was appointed as the team's new head coach.

Schedule

References

Western Michigan
Western Michigan Broncos football seasons
Western Michigan Broncos football